Enchantress Rocks is a small group of rocks lying off Elephant Point on the south side of western Livingston Island in the South Shetland Islands, Antarctica.  The area was visited by early 19th century sealers.

The feature is named after the British sealing ship  under Captain W. Bond that operated in the South Shetland in 1821–22.

Location

Maps
 L.L. Ivanov. Antarctica: Livingston Island and Greenwich, Robert, Snow and Smith Islands. Scale 1:120000 topographic map.  Troyan: Manfred Wörner Foundation, 2009.

References
Composite Antarctic Gazetteer.

Rock formations of Livingston Island